KMBH may refer to:

 KMBH-LD, a television station (channel 20, virtual 67) licensed to McAllen, Texas, United States 
 KFXV (TV), a television station (channel 16, virtual 60) licensed to Harlingen, Texas, United States, which used the call sign KMBH from 1984 until 2020
 KJJF, a radio station (88.9 FM) licensed to Harlingen, Texas, United States, which used the call sign KMBH-FM from 1991 until 2015